Allen's river garfish (Zenarchopterus alleni) is a species of viviparous halfbeak endemic to West Papua in Indonesia.

The Allen's river garfish was first discovered in the Mamberamo River in Papua, Indonesia. It is known from only one specimen. The specimen recovered measured  SL in length and had 14 dorsal soft rays and 13 anal soft rays. The specific name honours the American ichthyologist Gerald R. Allen.

References

Allens river garfish
Fish described in 1982
Freshwater fish of Western New Guinea
Taxonomy articles created by Polbot

Species known from a single specimen